Luca Shaw is a professional downhill Mountainbike racer. He races UCI world cups for the Canyon Collective Factory Team and the UCI World Championships for Team USA Cycling.

Personal life
Shaw was born in San Francisco, California but has been living in Hendersonville, North Carolina since he was 8. His older brother Walker is also a mountain bike racer. His father Doug Shaw works for Ohlins Suspension while his mother Griet Vandekerckhove works for a Belgian fashion designer. Since the summer of 2018, he has been in a relationship with Swiss cyclist Jolanda Neff.

References

Mountain bike trials riders
Living people
Year of birth missing (living people)
American mountain bikers